The Coloured Book protocols were a set of communication protocols for computer networks developed in the United Kingdom in the 1970s. The name originated with each protocol being identified by the colour of the cover of its specification document. The protocols were in use until the 1990s when the Internet protocol suite came into widespread use.

History 
First defined in 1975, they evolved through experience with the Experimental Packet Switched Service run by Post Office Telecommunications beginning in 1977. They were used on the SERCnet from 1980, and SWUCN from 1982, both of which became part of the JANET academic network from 1984. The protocols gained some acceptance internationally as the first complete X.25 standard, and gave the UK "several years lead over other countries".

From late 1991, Internet protocols were adopted on the Janet network instead; they were operated simultaneously for a while, until X.25 support was phased out entirely in August 1997.

Protocols
The standards were defined in documents identified by the colour of the cover:

The Pink Book
The Pink Book defined protocols for transport over Ethernet. The protocol was basically X.25 level 3 running over LLC2.

The Orange Book
The Orange Book defined protocols for transport over local networks using the Cambridge Ring (computer network).

The Yellow Book
The Yellow Book defined the Yellow Book Transport Service (YBTS) protocol, also known as Network Independent Transport Service (NITS), which was mainly run over X.25. It was developed by the Data Communications Protocols Unit of the Department of Industry in the late 1970s.  It could also run over TCP. The Simple Mail Transfer Protocol was extended to allow running over NITS.

The Yellow Book Transport Service was somewhat misnamed, as it does not fulfill the Transport role in the OSI 7-layer model. It really occupies the top of the Network layer, making up for X.25's lack of NSAP addressing at the time, which didn't appear until the X.25 (1980) revision, and wasn't available in implementations for some years afterwards. YBTS used source routing addressing between YBTS nodes—there was no global addressing scheme at that time.

The Green Book
The Green Book defined two protocols to connect terminals across a network: an early version of what became Triple-X PAD running over X.25, and the TS29 protocol modelled on Triple-X PAD, but running over YBTS. It was developed by Post Office Telecommunications. These protocols are similar in functionality to TELNET.

The Fawn Book
The Fawn Book defined the Simple Screen Management Protocol (SSMP)

The Blue Book
The Blue Book defined the Network-Independent File Transfer Protocol (NIFTP), analogous to Internet FTP, running over YBTS. Unlike Internet FTP, NIFTP was intended for batch mode rather than interactive usage.

The Grey Book
The Grey Book defined protocols for e-mail transfer (not file transfer as is sometimes claimed), running over Blue Book FTP.

The Red Book
The Red Book defined the Job Transfer and Manipulation Protocol (JTMP), a mechanism for jobs to be transferred from one computer to another, and for the output to be returned to the originating (or another) computer, running over Blue Book FTP.

Naming scheme 

One famous quirk of Coloured Book was that components of hostnames used reverse domain name notation as compared to the Internet standard. For example, an address might be user@UK.AC.HATFIELD.STAR instead of user@star.hatfield.ac.uk.

See also 

 Internet in the United Kingdom § History
 Protocol Wars

References

Sources 

 

A Dictionary of Computing. Oxford University Press, 2004, s.v. "coloured book"

External links 
alt.folklore.computers: "What is the British Grey Book protocol?"
 Janet website

History of computing in the United Kingdom
Network protocols
Wide area networks
X.25